The men's 100 metre freestyle event at the 2015 European Games in Baku took place on 24 and 25 June.

Results

Heats
The heats were started on 24 June at 09:30.

Swim-off
The swim-off was held on 24 June at 11:13.

Semifinals
The semifinals were started on 24 June at 17:42.

Semifinal 1

Semifinal 2

Final
The final was held on 25 June at 18:15.

References

Men's 100 metre freestyle